The 1987 World Marathon Cup was the second edition of the World Marathon Cup of athletics and were held in Seoul, South Korea on 12 April.

Results

Individual men

Individual women

References

Results
IAAF World Cup Men. Association of Road Racing Statisticians. Retrieved 2018-03-30.
IAAF World Cup Women. Association of Road Racing Statisticians. Retrieved 2018-03-30.

World Marathon Cup
World Cup
World Marathon Cup
Marathons in South Korea
International athletics competitions hosted by South Korea